Anguilla is a British overseas territory in the Caribbean.

Anguilla has become a popular tax haven, having no capital gains, estate, profit or other forms of direct taxation on either individuals or corporations. In April 2011, faced with a mounting deficit, it introduced a 3% "Interim Stabilisation Levy", Anguilla's first form of income tax.

Notable firms 
This list includes notable companies with primary headquarters located in the country. The industry and sector follow the Industry Classification Benchmark taxonomy. Organizations which have ceased operations are included and noted as defunct.

References 

Anguilla

Anguilla
Companies